Landfill usually refers to a waste dump.

Landfill may also refer to:

Land reclamation 
Landfill (Transformers), a character in the Transformers toy line